The Mitsubishi 8A8 engine is a range of V8 powerplants produced by Mitsubishi Motors since 1999. Financial pressures forced the company to discontinue sales of the Proudia and Dignity, the only vehicles in its range to which it was fitted, after only fifteen months.

However, the two vehicles were developed in partnership with the Hyundai Motor Company of South Korea, with whom Mitsubishi has had a longstanding relationship. While Mitsubishi makes the cylinder heads and other GDI-related equipment, Hyundai casts the aluminium block, and other major internal components. Hyundai's version of the Proudia/Dignity, the Equus, proved more successful, and this has been the sole application of the powerplant since 2001. Hyundai replaced the engine with its newly developed Tau V8 in 2008 when the second generation rear wheel drive Equus replaced the first model.

8A80 (1999–2008)

Bore pitch — 
 Stroke -- 
Power —  at 5000 rpm
Torque —  at 4000 rpm

Application
Mitsubishi Proudia
Mitsubishi Dignity
Hyundai Equus  First generation (LZ/YJ; 1999–2009)

See also
 List of Mitsubishi engines

Footnotes

8A8
V8 engines
Gasoline engines by model